What the World Needs Now is...Jackie DeShannon is a compilation CD by Jackie DeShannon, released by Capitol Records as catalog number 829786 in 1994. These tracks are culled from the vaults of her tenure at Liberty Records.

Track listing

Jackie DeShannon albums
1994 compilation albums
Capitol Records compilation albums